is a series of role-playing video games, developed by Game Arts in Japan and published in the United States by Working Designs, Ubisoft, and Xseed Games.

The original releases of The Silver Star and Eternal Blue were published for the Sega CD. The Silver Star was critically acclaimed and was the top selling game in Japanese Mega CD history. Both games were later remade for the Japanese Sega Saturn with considerable story, graphical, and musical changes. These remakes were later ported to the PlayStation in Japan and North America. The first game was also ported to the Microsoft Windows computer platform in Japan and Korea, and was later remade for the Game Boy Advance and PlayStation Portable in Japan and North America.

A side-story game, Lunar: Walking School for the Game Gear, was also remade for the Sega Saturn but has seen no North America release in any form. Backed by publisher Ubisoft, Game Arts created a new Lunar installment for the Nintendo DS, released in September 2005 in North America.

Plot

The Lunar stories take place on an inhabitable moon called Lunar, or "The Silver Star", that orbits a planet known as "The Blue Star". Thousands of years ago, the Blue Star was infected with evil by a dark god named Zophar. His evil corrupted the hearts of people, turning some into monsters to do his bidding. The survivors cried out to the patron-deity of the Blue Star, a Goddess named Althena, for help. She confronted Zophar in an epic battle, and was only able to stop him by using her powers of creation to seal him in another dimension, destroying nearly all life on the planet in the process.

Unable to restore the planet until several millennia had passed, Althena instead chose to transform the planet's moon into an earthlike world, and transported the survivors there. These included not only humans but also a race of "beast-men", and another race of elf-like beings skilled in wielding magic. The only elf-like being depicted in Lunar is Ghaleon, who is a confirmed member of the Vile Tribe in "Lunar: Vane Hikuusen Monogatari", which is mysteriously classified here as a "fourth race", despite there being only three. There was also a fourth race of people who would later come to be known as "The Vile Tribe" after they rejected Althena's teachings. She was forced to banish them to an area of Lunar called "The Frontier", a barren wasteland where even Althena's magical power could not reach. They became enemies of Althena and her followers for thousands of years.

To protect Lunar, Althena created four intelligent Dragons – a white one, a red one, a blue one, and a black one – that each shared a part of her divine power. There are only four Dragons at any given time, though they are replaced over time with younger ones. Strangely, during their infancy, these dragons resemble talking, winged cats, until they claim the power of their predecessor and ascend to adulthood. The Dragons spend most of their time sleeping underground until they are needed.

Althena also decreed that there would be a champion called The Dragonmaster to lead Lunar's heroes. This person would be anyone who managed to make their way to the hidden lairs of the Four Dragons, and pass their harrowing trials. There have been many Dragonmasters across the centuries, and many on Lunar have striven to achieve that title. The people of Lunar became very devoted to Althena, though many remember Lunar's origins as only an old legend. The various Lunar games and manga cover different events in Lunar's history.

Games

Main series

Spin-offs

Reception
The Lunar series has spawned a variety of other works in the setting, including a manga series, two artbooks, as well as novelizations of The Silver Star, Magic School Lunar! and Eternal Blue. The console titles have generally been received very positively; the two PlayStation versions generally place well in considerations of the best games available for the system. The original two games, and their remakes, have reviewed very well, averaging between 82% and 91%, and with Eternal Blue generally agreed to be the highest-reviewed Sega CD title in the history of the platform. Lunar Dragon Song, however, was panned critically, with an aggregate rating of 58% on GameRankings.

Sales
The series has sold over one million copies, placing it among the best-selling Japanese role-playing game franchises.

Total sales of Lunar franchise  1,052,011:
 Lunar: The Silver Star (Sega CD)  100,000 (Japan)
 Lunar: Eternal Blue (Sega CD)  89,480 (Japan)
 Lunar: Silver Star Story Complete (Sega Saturn)  200,035 (original release) in Japan; 8,346 (MPEG Version) in Japan
 Lunar 2: Eternal Blue Complete (Sega Saturn)  90,837 (Japan)
 Mahō Gakuen Lunar! (Sega Saturn)  15,999 (Japan)
 Lunar: Silver Star Story Complete (PlayStation)  44,802 (Japan)
 Lunar 2: Eternal Blue Complete (PlayStation)  53,983 (Japan)
 PlayStation releases  393,000 (US)
 Lunar Legend (Game Boy Advance)  13,506 (Japan)
 Lunar Genesis (Nintendo DS)  24,673 (Japan)
 Lunar: Silver Star Harmony (PSP)  17,350 (Japan)

Abandoned sequel
Since the release of the enhanced remakes of Lunar: Silver Star Story and Lunar 2: Eternal Blue, rumors have come and gone concerning the development of a game known only as Lunar 3. In a 1998 interview, Victor Ireland, president of Working Designs, stated that Lunar 3 was in the design phase. However, no such game was ever revealed by Game Arts or Entertainment Software Publishing, the Japanese publisher of the series. At the time Ireland, as part of a feud with Sega of America, repeatedly brought up during interviews that Working Designs held the American publication rights to the Lunar series and would only publish the games for non-Sega consoles, even threatening to port the games to competing consoles themselves if they were released exclusively for Sega consoles in Japan.

References

External links
 LunarNET - Fansite

 
GungHo Online Entertainment franchises
Video game franchises
Video game franchises introduced in 1992
Video games set on fictional moons